There were special elections in 1887 to the United States House of Representatives to the 49th United States Congress and the 50th United States Congress.

Elections are listed by date and district.

49th Congress 

|-
| 
| William T. Price
|  | Republican
| 1882
|  | Incumbent died December 6, 1886.New member elected January 18, 1887 to finish his father's term.Republican hold.
| nowrap | 

|}

50th Congress 

|-
| 
| John H. Reagan
|  | Democratic
| 18741861 1882
|  | Incumbent resigned March 4, 1887when elected U.S. senator.New member elected August 5, 1887.Democratic hold.
| nowrap | 

|-
| 
| Edward W. Robertson
|  | Democratic
| 18761882 1886
|  | Incumbent died August 2, 1887.New member elected November 8, 1887.Democratic hold.
| nowrap | 

|-
| 
| Nicholas T. Kane
|  | Democratic
| 1886
|  | Incumbent died September 14, 1887.New member elected November 8, 1887.Democratic hold.
| nowrap | 

|-
| 
| Frank Hiscock
|  | Republican
| 1876
|  | Incumbent member-elect resigned March 3, 1887 when elected U.S. senator.New member elected November 8, 1887.Republican hold.
| nowrap | 

|-
| 
| William T. Price
|  | Republican
| 1882
|  | Incumbent member-elect died December 6, 1886.New member elected January 18, 1887.Republican hold.
| nowrap | 

|}

See also 
 49th United States Congress
 50th United States Congress

References 

 
1887